The Buffalo Sabres are a professional ice hockey team based in Buffalo, New York, United States. The Sabres are members of the Atlantic Division of the Eastern Conference in the National Hockey League (NHL).

Nine former Buffalo Sabres players are enshrined in the Hockey Hall of Fame: Dave Andreychuk, Dick Duff, Grant Fuhr, Clark Gillies, Dale Hawerchuk, Tim Horton, Pat LaFontaine, Dominik Hasek, and Gilbert Perreault. Dominik Hasek won two Hart Memorial Trophies as NHL MVP while playing for the Sabres. In addition, Hasek won six Vezina Trophies as the NHL's top goaltender while playing for Buffalo; Ryan Miller and Tom Barrasso have won the Vezina while playing for the Sabres, while Don Edwards and Bob Sauve shared the trophy as Sabres in the 1979–80 season.  Barrasso also won the Calder Memorial Trophy as NHL rookie of the year while playing for the Sabres, as did Gilbert Perreault and Tyler Myers. Michael Peca won the Frank J. Selke Trophy while with the team.

Key
 Appeared in an Sabres game during the 2021–22 NHL season or is still part of the organization.
 retired jersey or elected to the Hockey Hall of Fame

* - Save percentage did not become an official NHL statistic until the 1982–83 season.  Therefore, goaltenders who played before 1982 do not have official save percentages.

The "Seasons" column lists the first year of the season of the player's first game and the last year of the season of the player's last game.  For example, a player who played one game in the 2000–01 season would be listed as playing with the team from 2000–2001, regardless of what calendar year the game occurred within.

Statistics complete as of the 2021–22 NHL season.

Goaltenders

Skaters

References

 

 
players
Buffalo Sabres players